Hugh Trevor Jones (born 12 November 1966) is an Australian politician and former Lieutenant Commander at the Royal Australian Navy. He was elected as the Member of Parliament for the electorate of Darling Range in the Western Australian Legislative Assembly for the Australian Labor Party at the 2021 state election.

Early life and naval career
Jones was born in a family of healthcare workers where his father was a dentist and mother a nurse. In 1990, he joined the Royal Australian Navy where he met future premier Mark McGowan.

Political career
In 2019, Jones was elected to the City of Armadale as a councillor for River Ward. Jones would later become the Labor party's candidate for the electoral district of Darling Range for the 2021 Western Australian state election. Darling Range had been held by Alyssa Hayden from the Liberal party since 2018, who had won it in a by-election after the resignation of Barry Urban. The seat was declared a seat to watch at the election by the Australian Broadcasting Corporation and The West Australian.

On 13 March 2021 during the state election, Jones won Darling Range with a swing of 15.4% from the results of the 2018 by-election. Jones actually won 56 percent of the primary vote, enough to win the seat without the need for preferences.

Personal life
Jones returned to Perth in 2005 and has two children, named Grace and Gryff. He is a former member of Kelmscott Roos Soccer Club and a former volunteer for the First Nations Homelessness Project.

References

Living people
1966 births 
Australian Labor Party members of the Parliament of Western Australia
Members of the Western Australian Legislative Assembly
21st-century Australian politicians
Western Australian local councillors